Airlines of Tasmania, commercially known by the name Par Avion is a regional airline based in Hobart, Tasmania, Australia. It operates scheduled services across a number of locations in Tasmania. Par Avion also operates a wide variety of charter services ranging from business, scenic flights into Tasmania's South West, group charter and leisure. Par Avion owns and operates Cambridge Aerodrome, a flying training school which is affiliated with the University of Tasmania and a tourism business into the Southwest National Park of Tasmania, including day and overnight trips in Bathurst Harbour.

History 

Airlines of Tasmania was established as a regular public transport operator (previously it had been an airwork operator) in 1977, along with Par-Avion, a different branding used for chartered and sightseeing flights. During its early years, the company had regular services to the West Coast from Queenstown and Strahan. In the 2004–2005 year there was a service between Hobart and Strahan, but this service was closed due to marginal traffic. Early in 2008, the airline moved its Melbourne operations from Moorabbin Airport to Essendon Airport, due to the airline upgrading its fleet by introducing the Dornier 228.

During October 2010, Sharp Airlines took over all scheduled operations to Flinders Island.

During July 2012, Sharp Airlines took over all scheduled operations to King Island.

In December 2013, the airline announced a partnership with the University of Tasmania, for flying training study as part of a Tertiary Qualification and is a Registered Training Organisation

In February 2014, the airline announced it was intending to expand into the mainland and commence regular services from Essendon to Griffith. Following approval by the Civil Aviation Safety Authority, the airline announced the first services would begin on 17 March, under the Par Avion brand. The airline will use Cessna 404 Titan aircraft on the new route. The airline has since dropped the route.

In September 2015 the airline announced they would introduce a new service from Hobart (Cambridge Aerodrome) to King Island via Wynyard and in partnership with Sharp Airlines. Flights commenced in November using 6-9 passenger seating Piper Navajo and the occasional service using Cessna 404 weeks before the route was dropped. Airlines of Tasmania / Par Avion Airlines would fly from Cambridge Aerodrome to Wynyard, passengers could then board a Sharp Airlines flight to connect with King Island. Flights operated twice daily on Monday, Wednesday and Friday. However flights were suspended in late 2015 due to poor passenger numbers.

Par Avion entered the Tasmanian Tourism Hall of Fame in 1999 (Tour and Transport Operator - Significant) and again in 2016 (Major Tour and Transport Operator) and won the 2014, Australian Tourism Award for Major Tour and Transport Operator (receiving Silver in 2016) for its tourism operations around Tasmania

In May 2019, Par Avion commenced airline services to Strahan from Hobart / Cambridge, with assistance of a Tasmanian state government grant, with services three times a week using a Cessna Titan, this service was again terminated at the end of the grant due to unsustainable passenger numbers.

Destinations 
The sightseeing flights under the Par Avion branding are conducted from the Cambridge Aerodrome base near Hobart.
In May 2019, the company commenced services to Strahan three times a week, and Hobart to Launceston twice a week
Par Avion provides chartered flights and as of November 2019, provides scheduled passenger services to the following locations:
Hobart-Cambridge
Launceston Airport
Cape Barren Island
Par Avion has previously operated to King Island, Flinders Island, Strahan, Burnie, Melbourne/Essendon and Griffith

Fleet 

As of October 2022, the Airlines of Tasmania fleet consists of the following aircraft:

Accidents and incidents 
The company has been involved in two separate fatal accidents. A Par-Avion Britten Norman Islander airplane impacted terrain near Federation Peak and the Western Arthur Range in December 2018 which resulted in the death of the pilot. And a Cessna 172 which impacted the ocean off the Tasman Peninsula in December 2014 resulting in the death of the company pilot and one passenger

See also
List of airlines of Australia

References

External links

 

Airlines established in 1977
Australian companies established in 1977
Airlines of Australia
Transport in Tasmania
Companies based in Hobart